Julie Doiron and the Wooden Stars is an album by Julie Doiron in collaboration with the indie rock band Wooden Stars, released in 1999. It represented the first time that Doiron had collaborated with a band since the end of Eric's Trip.

The album won the Juno Award for Alternative Album of the Year, in 2000.

Critical reception
The Cleveland Scene called the album "a minor masterpiece, filled with brooding melancholy that stops just short of being morose."

Track listing

References 

1999 albums
Julie Doiron albums
Wooden Stars albums
Juno Award for Alternative Album of the Year albums